Kounotori may refer to:

 The Japanese name for the Oriental stork
 Kounotori (spacecraft), an uncrewed cargo spacecraft, including a list of vehicles that share the name
 Kounotori (train), a train service in Japan